Trunk 8 is part of the Canadian province of Nova Scotia's system of Trunk Highways. Trunk 8 is also known as the Kejimkujik Scenic Drive.

Route description

From Liverpool, Trunk 8 runs in a northwesterly direction, following the east bank of the Mersey River to Milton. North of Milton, the road leaves the river, mostly travelling through forest land, to the village of Caledonia and west to the main entrance to Kejimkujik National Park. Trunk 8 crosses the Mersey River again at Maitland Bridge, following its west bank and the shores of several lakes to Milford; where it continues northward to the village of Lequille and the town of Annapolis Royal, where the route ends.

Major intersections

See also
 List of Nova Scotia provincial highways

References

008
Roads in Annapolis County, Nova Scotia
Roads in the Region of Queens Municipality